The fundamental resolution equation is used in chromatography to help relate adjustable chromatographic parameters to resolution, and is as follows:

Rs = [N1/2/4][(α-1)/α][k2'/(1+k2')], where

N = Number of theoretical plates

α = Selectivity Term = k2'/k1'

The [N1/2/4] term is the column factor, the [(α-1)/α] term is the thermodynamic factor, and the [k2'/(1+k2')] term is the retention factor.  The 3 factors are not completely independent, but they are very close, and can be treated as such.

So what does this mean?  It means that to increase resolution of two peaks on a chromatogram, one of the three terms of the equation need to be modified.

1) N can be increased by lengthening the column (least effective, as doubling the column will get a 21/2 or 1.44x increase in resolution).

2) Increasing k' also helps.  This can be done by lowering the column temperature in G.C., or by choosing a weaker mobile phase in L.C. (moderately effective)

3) Changing α is the most effective way of increasing resolution.  This can be done by choosing a stationary phase that has a greater difference between k1' and k2'.  It can also be done in L.C. by using pH to invoke secondary equilibria (if applicable).

The fundamental resolution equation is derived as follows:

For two closely spaced peaks, ω1 = ω2, and σ1 = σ2

so Rs = (tr2 - tr1)/ω2 = (tr2 - tr1)/4σ2

Where tr1 and tr2 are the retention times of two separate peaks.

Since N = [(tr2)/σ2]2, then σ = tr2/ N1/2

Using substitution, Rs = N1/2[(tr2 - tr1)/4tr2] = (N1/2/4)(1 - tr1/tr2)

Now using the following equations and solving for tr1 and tr2

k1' = (tr1 - t0)/t0 ;   tr1 = t0(k1' + 1)

k2' = (tr2 - t0)/t0 ;   tr2 = t0(k2' + 1)

Substituting again and you get:

Rs = [N1/2/4][1 - (k1' + 1)/(k2' + 1] = [N1/2/4][(k2' - k1')/(1 + k2')]

And finally substituting once more α = k2'/k1' and you get the Fundamental Resolution Equation:

Rs = [N1/2/4][(α-1)/α][k2'/(1+k2')]

References 

Spring 2009 Class Notes, CHM 5154, Chemical Separations taught by Dr. John Dorsey, Ph.D, Florida State University

Chromatography